The 1999–2000 Kent Football League season was the 34th in the history of Kent Football League a football competition in England.

League table

The league featured 18 clubs which competed in the previous season, no new clubs joined the league this season.

League table

References

External links

1999-2000
1999–2000 in English football leagues